The Landlord and Tenant (Rent Control) Act 1949 (12, 13 & 14 Geo. VI c. 40) was an Act of Parliament in the United Kingdom, intended to control excessive rents being charged by landlords. It extended the provisions of the Furnished Houses (Rent Control) Act 1946.

The major new provisions of the Act were:
The protection of the Rent Restriction Acts was given to both landlords and tenants sharing certain types of accommodation.
Rent tribunals were given the power to extend the security of lease given to tenants indefinitely, in three-month periods, and to review lettings made for the first time since September 1939.
Tribunals could now review the premiums paid for accommodation as well as the rent itself, and payments for furniture and other articles. Excess premiums could be recoverable by a reduction in rent.

See also
Rent regulation
English land law

References
Facts and Figures for Socialists, 1951, chapter 27. Labour Party Research Department, London, 1950

United Kingdom Acts of Parliament 1949
Landlord–tenant law
Housing in the United Kingdom
Britain
English land law
Regulation in the United Kingdom